Winston Chao Wen-hsuan (born 9 June 1960) is a Taiwanese actor. He came to international attention for his performance in the 1993 film The Wedding Banquet and Kabali. He is also known for his roles in Red Rose White Rose and Eat Drink Man Woman, and for his five portrayals of Sun Yat-sen, notably in the films The Soong Sisters (1997), Road to Dawn (2007) and 1911 (2011). His notable television roles include the adaptation of Cao Yu's play Thunderstorm (1997), a double role in the historical drama Palace of Desire, the biographical mini-series The Legend of Eileen Chang (2004), the historical drama Da Tang Fu Rong Yuan (2007), the adaptation of Ba Jin's novel Cold Nights (Han ye, 2009), and the portrayal of Confucius (2011). He acted in the Indian Tamil film, Kabali (2016), in a villainous role opposite Rajinikanth. He has also appeared in the English-language films Skiptrace (2016) and The Meg (2018).

Filmography

Feature films

Television series

Awards and nominations

References

External links

 
 Winston Chao at the Encyclopedia Asian Stars

Taiwanese male film actors
1960 births
Living people
Taiwanese male television actors